Ganagandharvan is a 2019 Indian Malayalam comedy film directed by Ramesh Pisharody and written by Pisharody and Hari P. Nair. Mammootty is playing a ‘ganamela’ singer named Kalasadhan Ullas. Debutante Vanditha Manoharan play the female lead. The film released to mixed response.

Synopsis

Kalasadhan Ullas (Mammootty) is a ganamela singer who works for the popular ganamela troupe Kalasadhan for the past 26 years. His family consists of his wife Mini (Vanditha Manoharan) and daughter Sowmya. However, Ullas's life takes a different turn after a girl named Sandra (Athulya) enters his life for a nefarious purpose. How he handles the following incidents from the crux of the story.

Cast

Production 
Ramesh Pisharody announced his second directorial venture was on 1 November 2018 by unveiling the title poster featuring Mammootty. It was screened in theatres with Mohanlal-starrer Drama (2018). According to Pisharody, "The film is about the life of a senior singer. The character is influenced by some singers I know. It's not a fully serious story. You can expect some humour as well." Newcomer Vanditha was roped in to play one of the female leads.

The principal photography of the film began at Kochi on 1 June 2019. Mammootty has three getups, one of which has him with a long hair. He completed shooting on 22 July 2019.

Soundtrack 

The music of the film is composed by Deepak Dev while lyrics are written by Rafeeq Ahmed and Santhosh Varma.

Release
The film was released on 27 September 2019.

Box office
In the UAE, it grossed $125,902 in the opening weekend and $172,068 in three weeks. It grossed $18,710 (₹13.32 lakh) in the US in three weeks. The film ended as a financial succuss, with a worldwide gross of ₹18.5 crore of which the final global theatrical share is estimated to be ₹9.75 crore with recovery more than 20 percent.

Reception 
The Times of India rated the film 3.5 out of 5 and wrote, "The strength of Ganagandharvan though is the acting and script. While Pisharody has resorted to straightforward, old school storytelling, he has done it with panache, proving that a good script does not need any gimmick to entertain the audience." Manorama Online gave 3 out of 5 and wrote, "Director Ramesh Pisharody has successfully presented a small yet relevant subject without making the audience feel tedious or irksome. This movie is sure to cater to the interests of all kinds of audience. Sify rated the film 2 out of 5, described the film "average" and wrote "there is a fine idea here that is worth a story, but the way the script has been written and packaged makes this one a rather dull affair".

The News Minute critic rated 1.5 out of 5 stars and said "Ganagandharvan tries too hard with badly written comedy. Except the occasional wisecrack or a reference to an old movie (the scene with Karaman Sudheer), the film is largely not amusing". Anna M. M. Vetticad of Firstpost rated 0.25 out of 5 and wrote "Pisharody's failure lies not only in his status-quoist, antagonistic ideology, but in his inability to tell a story well" and heavily criticized the anti-feministic writing. Manoj Kumar R of The Indian Express rated zero out of five stars and said the film "has a skeleton of a story to tell", "it is unclear why Mammootty would do such an in-your-face, one tone and biased film that neither understands men’s right activism or the plight of men that fall into the trap of some evil women". SR Praveen of The Hindu wrote "The whole appearance, aesthetics and structure of the movie harks back to a time gone by in Malayalam cinema. In that sense, the movie is almost like the titular character Ganagandharvan, who has become irrelevant, but doesn’t know ".

References

External links 
 

Films about music and musicians
Films scored by Deepak Dev
Indian musical comedy-drama films
Films shot in Thrissur
Films shot in Kochi
2019 films
2010s musical comedy-drama films
2010s Malayalam-language films
2019 comedy films
2019 drama films